Coubron is a commune in the Seine-Saint-Denis department, in the eastern suburbs of Paris, France.

Population

Heraldry

Transport
Coubron is served by no station of the Paris Métro, RER, or suburban rail network. The closest station to Coubron is Vert-Galant station on Paris RER line B. This station is located in the commune of Villepinte,  from the town center of Coubron.

Education
There are two groups of primary schools: Paul Bert and Georges Mercier.

See also
Communes of the Seine-Saint-Denis department

References

External links

 Home page 

Communes of Seine-Saint-Denis